Bill Battle Coliseum is a 2,000-seat multi-purpose arena in Birmingham, Alabama. The arena opened in 1981 and is home to the Birmingham-Southern College Panthers basketball team. 

The arena will be the venue for karate, jujitsu, and wushu taolu (invitational) during the 2022 World Games (previously scheduled for 2021).

References 

Sports venues in Birmingham, Alabama
College basketball venues in the United States
Indoor arenas in Alabama
1981 establishments in Alabama
Sports venues completed in 1981